Hackney was a parish in the historic county of Middlesex. The parish church of St John-at-Hackney was built in 1789, replacing the nearby former 16th-century parish church dedicated to St Augustine (pulled down in 1798). The original tower of that church was retained to hold the bells until the new church could be strengthened; the bells were finally removed to the new St John's in 1854. See details of other, more modern, churches within the original parish boundaries below.

Ancient parish
The vestry of the parish, in common with all parishes in England, was entrusted with various administrative functions from the 17th century. The parish vestry administered the Poor Law until 1837, until it became part of the Poor Law Union of Hackney. The ecclesiastical and civil roles of the parish increasingly diverged, and by the early nineteenth century they covered different areas.

Civil parish

A distinct civil parish dates from 1855, with the incorporation of The Vestry of the Parish of Hackney in the County of Middlesex by section 42 of the Metropolis Management Act. With Stoke Newington it formed part of the Hackney District, governed by the Hackney District Board of Works, within the area of the Metropolitan Board of Works.

Under the Metropolis Management Act 1855 any parish that exceeded 2,000 ratepayers was to be divided into wards; as such the parish of St John at Hackney within the Hackney District Boards of Works was divided into seven wards (electing vestrymen): No. 1 or Stamford Hill (15), No. 2 or West (18), No. 3 or De Beauvoir Town (18), No. 4 or Dalston (18), No. 5 or Hackney (18), No. 6 or Homerton (15) and No. 7 or South (18).

In 1894, the district and board were dissolved, with the Hackney vestry taking on its duties within the parish.
In 1894 as its population had increased the incorporated vestry was re-divided into eight wards (electing vestrymen): Stamford Hill (15), West (18), Kingsland (12), Hackney (12), Mare Street (15), South (15), Clapton (12) and Homerton (21).

In 1889 Hackney was included in the new County of London, and in 1900 the vestry was dissolved with the parish becoming the Metropolitan Borough of Hackney. The civil parish was abolished when the borough became part of the London Borough of Hackney in 1965.

The boundaries of the civil parish were identical to the ancient parish, and it covered  . The populations recorded in National Censuses were:

Hackney St John's Vestry 1801–1899

Ecclesiastical parish 

The ancient parish, was originally dedicated to St Augustine.  By  1660 it was rededicated to St John the Baptist and usually referred to as St John at Hackney. It and its successors are in the Diocese of London. From 1825, building and the population of Hackney increased rapidly and new parishes were formed, a few of which have since been dissolved:
 St John of Jerusalem, South Hackney in 1825
 St James, West Hackney aka (West Hackney Church) in 1825
 St Thomas the Apostle, Stamford Hill in 1828
 St Philip, Dalston in 1841
 St Peter, De Beauvoir Town in 1841
 St Barnabas, Homerton in 1846
 St James the Greater, Clapton in 1863
 St Augustine of Canterbury, Hackney Wick in 1867
 St Matthew, Upper Clapton in 1866 
 Christ Church, Clapton in 1871
 All Saints, Lower Clapton in 1873
 St Luke, Homerton in 1873
 Holy Trinity, Dalston in 1879
 All Souls, Clapton Park in 1884
 St Michael and All Angels, Stoke Newington Common in 1886
 St Paul, Lower Homerton in 1889
 St Mary of Eton, Hackney Wick in 1893
 St Bartholomew, Dalston in 1897

Periphal parts of the ancient parish contributed to three other new parishes as follows:
 St Michael and All Angels, South Hackney London Fields in 1865 — with parts of St Jude, Bethnal Green
 Christ Church, South Hackney in 1871 — with parts of St James the Less, Bethnal Green, St John, Bethnal Green, and St Stephen, Haggerston
 St Mark, Dalston in 1871 — with parts of St Matthias, Stoke Newington

External links
 Hackney Local Government
 Description of Hackney Parish in 1839
 Description of Hackney Parish in 1868
 Hackney Churches

Sources
 Guide to the Local Administrative Units of England, Vol.1, Frederic Youngs, London, 1979

History of the London Borough of Hackney
Religion in the London Borough of Hackney
Parishes governed by vestries (Metropolis) 
Parishes united into districts (Metropolis)
Former civil parishes in London
Bills of mortality parishes